This is a list of dragons in tabletop and video games. If there are many dragons then only the most notable are mentioned.

Dragons in video games

Roles
Player character – The dragon is the main character controlled by the player through all or most of the game. (IE Spyro, Trogdor)
Playable character – The dragon is a character that if selected can be controlled. (IE Liu Kang)
Companion - The dragon is a character that usually follows the player and can often be controlled as a riding mount. (IE Flammie, Azurda)
Boss – The dragon is a boss to be defeated by the player. (IE, Volvagia, Lord of the Lightning, Elder Dragons in Monster Hunter)
Final Boss – The dragon is the final boss in the game. (IE Alduin, Ridley, Grigori, Jack of Blades, Deathwing, Ender Dragon, Singe)
Optional Boss – The dragon is an optional boss.
Playable Character Transformation – The dragon is an alternate form the player's character can take. (IE Kameo)
Enemy – The dragon is a general enemy in the game. 
Trainable Monster – The dragon is a monster used in a battle in an arena against another monster. (IE 'Dragon type' Pokémon, 'Dramon's in Digimon)
Supporting Character – The dragon helps the player at points throughout the game. (IE Valoo, Paarthurnax)
Unit – The dragon is a controllable battle unit in the game. (IE dragons in Warhammer Total War)
Collectible Card – The dragon is a digital card in the digital collectible card game which can be obtained to customize and improve player's decks. (Dragons in Hearthstone, Clash Royale)
Various – Dragons play multiple roles in the game.

Dragons in role-playing video games
Dragons appear in numerous role-playing games with fictional setting as bosses, final bosses, and enemies, as well as player characters, companions, and supporting characters.

Dragons in multiplayer online games

Dragons in other video game genres
{| class="wikitable sortable" 
! bgcolor="#99ccff" |Video game
! bgcolor="#99ccff" | Name of Dragon
! bgcolor="#99ccff" | Type
! bgcolor="#99ccff" | Transforms, if so from what?
! bgcolor="#99ccff" | Voice Actor
! bgcolor="#99ccff" | Role
! bgcolor="#99ccff" | Notes
|-
|Dragon Spirit
| Amul || Wyvern || Human || || Player Character ||
|-
|ActRaiser
| Arctic Wyvern || Wyvern || No || || Boss ||
|-
|Alisia Dragoon
| Dragon Frye, Ball O' Fire, Thunder Raven, Boomerang Lizard || European || No || || Companions ||
|-
|The Legend of Zelda: Twilight Princess
| Argorok || Wyvern || No || || Boss || Twilit Dragon
|-
|Asghan: The Dragon Slayer
| Various || European || No || || Bosses ||
|-
|DragonHeart: Fire & Steel
| Draco and others || European || No ||  || Companion and bosses ||
|-
|Drakan
| Arokh || European || No || Jeff McNeal, David Scully || Companion || Many other dragons appear
|-
|Kameo: Elements of Power
| Ash || European || Fairy || || Playable Character Transformation || Ash is an element of fire
|-
|Dragon Breed
| Bahamoot || Serpentine || No || || Companion ||
|-
|Bakugan
| Various || Various || Ball ||  || Trainable Monsters ||
|-
|The Simpsons: Bart vs. the World
| Unnamed || Asian || No || || Enemies ||
|-
|Battle Chess II: Chinese Chess
| Unnamed || Asian || Horse || || Player units ||
|-
|The Incredible Toon Machine
| Bik || European || No || || Non-playable ||
|-
|Black Lamp
| Unnamed || European || No || || Boss ||
|-
|Far Cry 3: Blood Dragon
| Blood Dragons || Wingless, Quadrupedal || No || || Enemies || Can shoot lasers from their eyes
|-
|Super Princess Peach
| Blizzaurus || European || No || || Boss ||
|-
|Bomberman Wars
| Bomber Dragon || European || No || || Unit ||
|-
|Starbound
| Bone Dragon || Wyvern || No || || Boss ||
|-
|Yoshi's Story
| Bone Dragon and serpentine dragons || European (3H) and serpentine dragons || No || || Boss || Undead, skeletal dragon boss, and dragons who Yoshi rides to traverse some levels
|-
| Bubble Bobble Series
| Various || European || No || || Main Character ||
|-
|The Sims
| Burnie, Pyritie, Torch || European || No || || Player Companion ||
|-
|Dragon Rage
| Cael Cyndar || European || No || || Player Character ||
|-
|Call of Duty: Black Ops III
| Unnamed || Wyvern || No || || Various ||
|-
|The Cave
| Unnamed || European || No || || Boss ||
|-
|Banjo-Tooie
| Chili Billi, Chilly Willy || European || No || || Bosses || Twin brothers, one breathes fire, the other breathes ice
|-
|Cobra Triangle
| Unnamed || Serpentine || No || || Boss ||
|-
|Colorful Dragon
| Various || European || No || || Playable character and non-player characters ||
|-
|Crimson Dragon
| Various || Wyvern || No || || Player Character/companion || The paler rides dragons throughout the game.
|-
|Crash Bandicoot: The Wrath of Cortex
| Various || European || No || || Boss / Enemy ||
|-
|Darby the Dragon
| Darby || European || || || Player character ||
|-
|Digimon
| Various || Various || No || || Trainable Monsters ||
|-
|Disciples II: Dark Prophecy
| Various || European || No || || Various ||
|-
|Discworld
| Unnamed || European || No || || Boss ||
|-
|Donkey Kong 64
| Dogadon || Hybrid || No || || Boss || Dragonfly-Dragon hybrid
|-
|Master of Magic
| Draconians || European || No || || Playable Character || 
|-
|Castlevania: Lords of Shadow
| Dracula || European || Vampire || Robert Carlyle || Player Character || A powerful attack
|-
|DuckTales: Remastered
| Dracula Duck || Serpentine || Duck || Frank Welker || Boss ||
|-
|Captain Toad: Treasure Tracker
| Draggadon || Asian || No || || Boss || 
|-
|Animal Crossing
| Drago || Asian || No || || Supporting Character || Drago is a character who can move into the players village
|-
|Wario's Woods
| Drago || European || No || || Boss ||
|-
|Sacrifice
| Dragon || European || No || || Unit ||
|-
|Shrek 
|Dragon|| European || No || || Final Boss ||
|-
|Viva Pinata
| Dragonache || Other || No || || Breedable animal || Color depends on the main landscape of the garden
|-
|New Super Mario Bros. U
| Dragoneel || Serpentine || No || || Enemies || 
|-
|Donkey Kong: Jungle Climber
| Dragon Kremling || Asian || No || || Boss ||
|-
|Altered Beast
| Dragon Man || European || Human || || Playable Character Transformation ||
|-
|Dragonseeds
| Various || Asian || No || || Trainable Monster ||
|-
|Donkey Kong Jungle Beat
| Dragon Slot || Serpentine || No || || Supporting Character ||
|-
|Battle Realms
| Dragon Spirit || Asian || No || || Unit || Called down by Dragon Clan
|-
|The Longest Journey, Dreamfall
| Draic Kin || European || No || || Supporting Characters || Extraterrestrial sentient beings
|-
|Endless Legend
| Drakken || Wyvern || No || || Unit ||
|-
|Star Fox Adventures
| Drakor || European || No ||  || Boss || Fourth boss
|-
|The Lord of the Rings: The Battle for Middle-earth II
| Drogoth || European || No || || Unit ||
|-
|Forgotten Worlds
| Dust Dragon || European || No || || Boss ||
|-
|Earth Defense Force 2025
| Unnamed || European || No || || Enemies ||
|-
|The Legend of Zelda: Skyward Sword
| Eldin, Faron, Lanayru || Eastern || No || || Supporting Characters || 
|-
|Minecraft
| Ender Dragon || European || No || || Final Boss || Purple-eyed black scaled dragon living in The End. Name stated to be "Jean?"
|-
|Muck
| Bob || European || No || || Final Boss ||
|-
|Kirby's Epic Yarn
| Fangora || European || No || || Boss ||
|-
|Ghostbusters Genesis
| Fire Dragon || Serpentine || No || || Boss ||
|-
|The Great Circus Mystery Starring Mickey & Minnie
| Dragon Pete || European || Cat || || Final Boss || After being defeated in the first form as wizard, Pete transforms into a red dragon
|-
|The Legend of Zelda: Breath of the Wild
| Dinraal, Farosh, Naydra || Asian || No || ||Bosses ||
|-
|Dungeons & Dragons: Tower of Doom
| Flamewing || European || No || || Superboss ||
|-
|Blazing Dragons
| Flicker || European || No || || Player character ||
|-
|The King of Dragons
| Gildiss || European || No || || Final Boss ||
|-
|The Legend of Zelda
| Aquamentus, Gleeok || European / (2H) || No || || Boss ||
|-
|Super Mario Galaxy 2
| Gobblegut || Serpentine || No || || Boss || Also fought in a harder fire form
|-
| Zork: Grand Inquisitor
| Griff || European || No || Marty Ingels || Supporting Character || 
|-
|Golden Axe: Beast Rider
| Great Dragon || European || No || || Boss ||
|-
|ActRaiser 2
| Greed || European || No || || Boss ||
|-
|Cuphead
| Grim Matchstick || European || No || || Boss ||
|-
|Atari Adventure
| Grundle, Rhindle and Yorgle || Asian || No || || Bosses ||
|-
|Marvel's Guardians of the Galaxy
| Fin Fang Foom || Alien || No || || Boss ||
|-
|Harry Potter and the Goblet of Fire (video game)
| Unnamed || wyvern || No || || Enemy ||
|-
|Haruka: Beyond the Stream of Time
| Unnamed || Asian || No || || Supporting Character ||
|-
|Kid Icarus: Uprising
| Hewdraw || Serpentine (3H) || No || Danny Mann || Boss ||
|-
|Heroes of Might and Magic series
| Various || Various || No || || Units ||Green dragon (Gold dragon, Emerald dragon), Bone dragon (Ghost dragon, Spectral dragon), Shadow dragon (Red dragon, Black dragon), Faerie dragon, Rust dragon, Crystal dragon, Azure dragon
|-
|Hoard
| Unnamed || European || No || || Player Character ||
|-
|Dragon Saber
| Huey, Siria || Wyvern || Human || || Player Character ||
|-
|Donkey Kong Country: Tropical Freeze
| Ice Dragon || European || No || || Enemies || 
|-
|Kirby's Dream Land 2
| Ice Dragon || Wingless, bipedal || No || || Boss || Breathes ice instead of fire.
|-
|American Dragon: Jake Long – Attack of the Dark Dragon
| Jake Long || European || Human || || Player Character ||
|-
|Weaving Tides
| Kilim || serpentine || || || Player Character ||
|-
|Star Wars: Bounty Hunter
| Krayt Dragon || Alien, wingless, quadrupedal || No || || Boss ||
|-
|King's Quest
| Unnamed || European || No || || Boss ||
|-
|Kingdom II: Shadoan
| Unnamed || European || No || || Boss || Will eat the main character if he doesn't solve a puzzle
|-
|Resident Evil Village
| Lady Dimitrescu || Other || Vampire || Maggie Robertson || Boss || 
|-
|Rastan
| Laios, Hydra, and red dragon boss || European and serpentine || || || Bosses || 
|-
|Lair
| Various || European || No || || Companion ||
|-
|Kirby's Return to Dream Land
| Landia || Wyvern (4H) || No || || Boss || Each of Landia's four heads is able to split from the main body to form a smaller dragon.
|-
|Mortal Kombat
|Liu Kang|| Asian || Human ||  || Playable Character || Fatality
|-
|Wonder Boy III: The Dragon's Trap
| Lizard Man || European || Human || || Playable Character Transformation || 
|-
|Loom
| Unnamed || European || No || || Boss ||
|-
|Super Mario Odyssey
| Lord of the Lightning || European || No || || Boss ||
|-
|Nail 'n' Scale
| Lore || European || No || || Boss ||
|-
|Mega Man
| Mecha Dragon || European || No || || Boss ||
|-
|Sonic Heroes
| Metal Overlord || Other || Robot || || Final Boss ||
|-
|Sonic and the Black Knight
| Mist, Earth Dragon || Various || No || || Boss ||
|-
|Sorcer Striker
| Miyamoto || European || No || || Playable Character ||
|-
|Monster Hunter
| Various || Various || No || || Bosses ||
|-
|Monster Maulers
| Unnamed || Serpentine || No || || Boss ||
|-
|The Elder Scrolls Adventures: Redguard
| Nafaalilargus || Wyvern || No || Jonathan Bryce || Boss || Calls himself "The Crown Jewel of the Empire"
|-
|Alcahest
| Nevis || European || Human || || Playable character ||
|-
|Neopets
| Various || European || No || || Playable Character ||
|-
|Age of Mythology
| Nidhogg || European || No || || Unit ||
|-
|The Legend of Zelda: Oracle of Seasons
| Aquamentus, Onox || European / Wyvern || No / Human ||  || Boss / Final Boss || Dark Dragon as true form
|-
|Ōkami
| Orochi, Yomigami || Asian (8H) / Asian || No || || Boss / Supporting Character ||
|-
|Panzer Dragoon (series)
| Various || Various || No || || Companion ||
|-
|Towdie
| Quido || European || No || || Villain ||
|-
|War of the Monsters
| Raptros || European || No || || Playable Character ||
|-
|Kirby Super Star
| Red Dragon/Great Dragon || European || No|| || Boss || Holographic dragon summoned by the Computer Virus boss
|-
|Reign of Fire
| Unnamed || Wyverns || || || Player characters, enemies and bosses ||
|-
|Metroid series
| Ridley || Other || No || || Final Boss || Reappears as Meta Ridley
|-
|Rock of Ages
| Unnamed || European || No || || Boss ||
|-
|Super Mario Odyssey
| Ruined Dragon || European || No || || Boss ||
|-
|Scooby-Doo! Unmasked
| Unnamed || Asian || Mubber || || Boss || Zen Tuo's dragon
|-
|Conan
|Sand Dragon || Wingless, quadrupedal || No || ||Boss ||
|-
|The Lost Vikings 2
|Scorch || European || No || ||Player character ||
|-
|Subnautica
|Sea Dragon || Alien || || || Enemy ||
|-
|Simon the Sorcerer
| Unnamed || European || No || || Supporting Character || Has a cold when first encountered
|-
|Dragon's Lair
| Singe || European || No || || Final Boss ||
|-
|Cave Story
| Sky Dragons || European || No || || Bosses ||
|-
|The Hobbit
| Smaug || European || No || James Horan || Boss || Bilbo has to take a golden cup from him
|-
|Lego The Hobbit
| Smaug || Wyvern || No || || Boss ||
|-
|Ninja Gaiden
| Smaugan || European || No || || Boss ||Other dragons appear
|-
|Diddy Kong Racing
| Smokey || European || No || || Rival ||
|-
|Demon's Crest
| Somulo || European || No || || Boss ||
|-
|Donkey Kong Jungle Beat
| Space Dragon || Serpentine || No || || Obstacle ||
|-
|Spyro series
|Spyro, Cynder
|European
|No / 
Shadowy form, Explosive skull
|Carlos Alazraqui, Tom Kenny, Jess Harnell, Elijah Wood, Josh Keaton, Matthew Mercer, Justin Long /
Cree Summer, Mae Whitman, Christina Ricci, Tobie LaSalandra, Erica Lindbeck, Felicia Day

|Playable Character
|Spyro's objectives vary depending on the series. However, as of The Legend of Spyro and Skylanders, he is a purple dragon capable of controlling all elements, but is classified as Magic element in Skylanders.
Cynder is a former servant of Malefor in both versions, but the result of her corruption results in different effects on her. In Legend of Spyro, she gains control over shadows, poison, fear, and wind, but in Skylanders, she becomes an Undead elemental, capable of using spectral lightning, summoning ghosts, and turning into a shadow form.
|-
|Keio Flying Squadron
| Spot || European || No || || Companion ||
|-
|Summoners War: Sky Arena
| Various || European || No || || Companion ||
|-
|Super Smash Bros.
| Super Dragon Yoshi || European || Dinosaur || Kazumi Totaka || Turns into a dragon with a powerup
|-
|Super Ghouls 'n Ghosts
| Unnamed || Asian (3H) || No || || Boss ||
|-
|Syvalion
| Unnamed || Asian || No || || Player character ||
|-
|Space Harrier
| Uriah || Asian || No || || Companion ||
|-
|Devil World
| Tamagon || Other || No || || Player character ||
|-
|Thanatos
| Thanatos || Wyvern || No || || Player Character ||
|-
|Tomb Raider 2
| Unnamed || Asian || Human || || Boss ||
|-
|How to Train Your Dragon
| Toothless and various others || European || Yes || || Player characters and companions ||
|-
|Total War: Warhammer
| Various || European || No || || Units ||
|-
|Total War: Warhammer II
| Various || European || No || || Units ||
|-
|Homestar Runner
|Trogdor|| Other || No || || Player character || The Burninator
|-
|True Crime: Streets of LA
| Unnamed || Asian || No || || Boss || 
|-
|Fur Fighters
| Tweek, Gwyneth || European || No || || Playable character ||
|-
|The Legend of Zelda: The Wind Waker
| Valoo || European || No || || Supporting Character ||
|-
|Dragon Blade: Wrath of Fire
| Valthorian, Jagira, Skaroth, Mobrius, Norgiloth, Vormanax || European  || || || Companion and bosses ||
|-
|Viking: Battle for Asgard
| Various || European || || || Companions ||
|-
|Hyrule Warriors
| Volga || European || Human || || Boss, Playable Character ||
|-
|The Adventure of Link
| Volvagia || Asian || No || ||Boss ||
|-
|The Legend of Zelda: Ocarina of Time
| Volvagia || Asian || No ||  || Boss || Subterranean Lava Dragon
|-
|Zelda's Adventure
| Warbane || Western || No || || Boss ||
|-
| Ninja Gaiden II 
| Water Dragon|| Western || No || || Boss || Also appears in Ninja Gaiden Sigma 2
|-
|Wildlife Park: Ultimate Edition
| Unnamed || European || No || || Player Character || Others
|-
| Wing War (Atari 2600)
| Unnamed || European || No || || Player Character ||
|-
| Doom Eternal
| Wintherin || European || No || || Supporting Character ||
|-
|Threads of Fate
| Wylaf || European || No || || Supporting Character ||
|-
|Terraria
| Wyvern || Asian || No || || Enemy || Despite being called "wyverns" they resemble an Asian dragon
|-
|Hype: The Time Quest
| Zatila, Voydh || European || No ||  || Companion / Boss ||
|-
|Zoids Series
| Various || Various || No || || Various ||
|-
|Freedom Planet
| Sash Lilac || Alien || No || Dawn M. Bennett || Playable Character || A half-breed water dragon and one of the playable protagonists of the game.
|-
|Dragonriders: Chronicles of Pern'
| Various || European || No || || Companions ||
|}

Dragons in games for mobile devices
There are a number of casual, idle, life simulation and other types of games for mobile devices involving dragons.

Dragons in tabletop games
Dragons in tabletop role-playing games
Dragons are common (especially as non-player characters) in Dungeons & Dragons and in some fantasy role-playing video games. They, like many other dragons in modern culture, run the full range of good, evil, and everything in between. In Dungeons and Dragons, the color of the dragon shows if it is evil or good. Metallic dragons are forces of good and they are led by the mighty dragon-god Bahamut. Chromatic dragons are evil creatures ranging from white (the weakest) to the mighty red (the strongest). The chromatic dragons revere Tiamat, a five-headed dragon-god with heads of each color of the evil dragon (red, blue, green, white, black).
Various Great Feathered Serpent dragons, Great Eastern dragons, Great Western dragons, Great Sirrush dragons, and others in Shadowrun Various types of dragons found in the Rifts role-playing game.
 Various Great Western dragons and others in EarthdawnDragons in board games
 Red, green and white dragon tiles in Mahjong.
 Darkfyre in DragonStrike (board game) Dragon chess, a three-board chess variant designed by Gary Gygax, has a dragon piece.
 Big Snore, the sleepy purple title dragon from Don't Wake the Dragon!, a mid-1980s children's board game
 Carcassonne - The Princess & the Dragon, an expansion for Carcassonne (board game), centers around a dragon represented by a large wooden piece
 Mimring (the evil red dragon), Charos (the green dragon), Braxas (the black dragon queen), and Niflhelm (the white dragon king) are some of the most powerful characters in Heroscape.

Dragons in card games
Fantasy card games often feature dragons, often many of them, and thus this sub-section only mentions the more popular or important ones.

Magic: The Gathering
Dragon is a creature subtype in Magic: The Gathering. The Primeval Dragons in the Invasion block, namely Crosis, the Purger; Darigaaz, the Igniter; Dromar, the Banisher; Rith, the Awakener and Treva, the Renewer
 The Elder Dragon Legends from the Legends block, namely Arcades Sabboth, Chromium, Nicol Bolas, Palladia-Mors and Vaevictis Asmadi
 Draco, an extremely powerful artifact dragon, that has the highest mana cost in the game (16 colorless mana).
 Rorix Bladewing, a Shivan dragon who fights in the Otarian Grand Coliseum to reclaim his nation's honor: upon his death, Rorix is reincarnated as a "dracolich", under the name Bladewing the Risen.
 The Guardian Ryuu of Kamigawa, including Jugan, the Rising Star; Keiga, the Tide Star; Kokusho, the Evening Star; Ryusei, the Falling Star; and Yosei, the Morning Star.
 Niv-Mizzet, the insightful but short-tempered dragon wizard and leader of the Izzet guild in Ravnica.
 The Planar Chaos set introduces a new cycle of legendary Dragons bearing many similarities to the Invasion cycle - Oros, the Avenger; Intet, the Dreamer; Teneb, the Harvester; Numot, the Devastator; and Vorosh, the Hunter.
 The Future Sight set contains a legendary dragon called Tarox Bladewing in its "futureshifted" sheet. Tarox is apparently the son of the above-mentioned Rorix Bladewing, and according to his flavour text, "despises his siblings as insults to his line, finding and devouring each in turn". According to the magicthegathering.com article that previewed Tarox, he wants to be just like his father Rorix - although smaller than his father, Tarox's controller can discard another Tarox from their hand to double his size, making him a far heavier hitter than Rorix.
 There are also numerous other dragons, which have appeared in almost every set and every block. The most notable such dragon is Shivan Dragon, which has appeared in all but one of the Magic Core Sets.

World of Warcraft Trading Card GameWorld of Warcraft Trading Card Game features many dragons from Warcraft universe, including Onyxia, Deathwing, Alexstrasza and all the other Aspects.

Diablo
Tathamet in Diablo is the First Ultimate and True Prime Evil and Seven Headed Dragon who battle Anu and also create Seven Great Evils from his heads and Hell.

Yu-Gi-Oh!
Dragon is also a monster type in the Yu-Gi-Oh! Trading Card Game. Dragons in Yu-Gi-Oh! include:
The Blue-Eyes White Dragon and its incarnations, including Paladin of White Dragon (A ritual monster and younger version of Blue Eyes), Blue-Eyes Ultimate Dragon (the fusion of three Blue-Eyes White Dragon), Dragon Master Knight (A fusion monster composed of Black Luster Soldier and Blue-Eyes Ultimate Dragon) and Blue-Eyes Shining Dragon, and Blue-Eyes Toon Dragon (A Toon version of the Blue-Eyes White Dragon).
 The Red-Eyes B. Dragon, and its incarnations, including Red-Eyes B. Chick, Paladin of Dark Dragon (A ritual monster and younger version of Red Eyes, but called Knight of Dark Dragons in the anime), Lord of the Red (A ritual monster and almost a human form of Red Eyes), Red-Eyes Wyvern, Red-Eyes Black Metal Dragon, Red-Eyes Darkness Dragon, Red-Eyes Darkness Metal Dragon, and its many Fusion monsters.
 Baby Dragon which morphs into Thousand Dragon using Time Wizard. In the TCG/OCG, Thousand Dragon is a Fusion monster with Time Wizard and Baby Dragon and its materials.
 Curse of Dragon and its Fusion form Gaia the Dragon Champion (A fusion monster composed of Gaia the Fierce Knight and Curse of Dragon) 
 Slifer the Sky Dragon (Sky Dragon of Osiris), the Egyptian god Osiris card avatar.
 The Winged Dragon of Ra
 The Eye of Timaeus, The Fang of Critius, and The Claw of Hermos, and their human knight counterparts; the Legendary Dragon Cards|Three Legendary Dragons
 Cyber Dragon variants, though actually classed as Machine type monsters, can easily be compared to the Blue-Eyes White Dragon.
 Rainbow Dragon, the Crystal Lord, and Rainbow Dark Dragon
 Chaos Emperor Dragon - Envoy of the End
 White Night Dragon
 Five-Headed Dragon (originally known as F.G.D.)
 The Five Dragons linked to the Signers: Stardust Dragon, Red Dragon Archfiend, Black Rose Dragon, Ancient Fairy Dragon, Black-Winged Dragon, and Life Stream Dragon. This also includes their "Buster/Assault Mode"(Stardust Dragon /Assault Mode and Red Dragon Archfiend / Assault Mode) "Majestic/Savior"(Majestic Star Dragon and Majestic Red Dragon) Cosmic Sychro Monster Forms(Shooting Star Dragon, Red Nova Dragon, and Cosmic Blazar Dragon, technically both Shooting Star Dragon and Cosmic Blazar Dragon are both Accel Synchro while Red Nova Dragon is Double Tuning) and Limit Over Accel Synchro(Shooting Quasar Dragon).
 Dragon Knight Draco-Equiste (A fusion monster composed of 1 Dragon-Type Synchro monster + 1 Warrior-Type monster) 
 Hundred Eyes Dragon ( A dragon who serves the Earthbound Immortals)
 The Inca archetypes, Sun Dragon Inti and Moon Dragon Quilla
Jormungardr The Nordic Serpent
 Several evolutionary dragons, such as Armed Dragons, Horus the Black Flame Dragon and some others.
The Malefic Dragons the evil or the corrupted versions of the signature dragons throughout the Yu-Gi-Oh! series e.g. Malefic Stardust Dragon, Malefic Cyber End Dragon, Malefic Rainbow Dragon, Malefic Red-Eyes Black Dragon, Malefic Blue-Eyes White Dragon and most notably the Malefic Paradox Dragon and Malefic Truth Dragon.

Cardfight!! Vanguard
Several races and clans within the Cardfight!! Vanguard'' trading card game are heavily based around dragons. A few of the races that are based on dragons include:
Flame Dragon, found only in the Kagero and Narukami clan this race is the typical fire breathing dragon archetype. Notable units include Dragonic Overlord, Dragonic Overlord the End, Dauntless Drive Dragon, Gattling Claw Dragon, and Vortex Dragon.
Cosmo Dragon, a powerful race considered holy and usually associated with bringing judgment upon evil forces. Notable units include Soul Saver Dragon and Satellitefall Dragon.
Abyss Dragon, the abyss dragons are known for their strength and willingness to sacrifice allied units to gain extra power. Notable units include: Phantom Blaster Dragon, Phantom Blaster Overlord, Spectral Duke Dragon, Revenger, Raging Form Dragon and Revenger, Dragruler Phantom
Dino Dragon, unique to the Tachikaze clan. As their name would suggest, they appear more dinosaur-like than dragon-like. Notable units include Tyrant, Deathrex, Dragon Egg, and Sonic Noa.
Winged Dragon, the typical flying dragon. Many of these units are mechanized. Notable units include Wyvern Strike, Tejas, Wyvern Strike, Jarran and Hex Cannon Wyvern.
Dragonman, are units that share the features of both man and dragon. Notable units include Lizard Runner, Undeux, Wyvern Guard, Barri, and Demonic Dragon Berserker, Yaksha.
Thunder Dragon, found only in the Narukami clan this race are dragons that are attacking with lightning or thunder base. Notable units include Dragonic Kaiser Vermillion, Dragonic Kaiser Vermillion "THE BLOOD", Eradicator, Vowing Sword Dragon and Eradicator, Dragonic Descendant.
Cyber Dragon, found only in the Link Joker clan this race are mechanical looking dragons and capable of locking your opponents rear-guards. Notable units include: Star-vader, Mobius Breath Dragon, Gravity Ball Dragon, Gravity Collapse Dragon, Schwarzschild Dragon, Star-vader, Infinite Zero Dragon, Star-vader, Nebula Lord Dragon and Star-vader, Chaos Breaker Dragon.
Tear Dragon, found in the clans of Kagero and but mostly Aqua Force these dragons are water-based attackers and can attack up to 3-5 times in 1 turn. Notable units include Blue Storm Dragon, Maelstrom, Blue Storm Supreme Dragon, Glory Maelstrom, Blue Flight Dragon, Trans-core Dragon, Last Card, Revonn, Blue Wave Dragon, Tetra-drive Dragon.
Zeroth Dragons is a race featured on one card of each nation, The Zeroth Dragons are weapons of mass destruction born from the Dragon Deity of Destruction, Gyze. The apostles of Gyze plan to use these dragons to revive him. These dragons can be played to any clan that represents their nation and also if this Grade 4 units failed to attack your opponent's Vanguard you cannot use your G-Zone cards anymore during the Cardfight This units are United Sanctuary's Zeroth Dragon of Zenith Peak, Ultima, Dragon Empire's Zeroth Dragon of Inferno, Drachma, Star Gate's Zeroth Dragon of Destroy Star, Stark, Dark Zone's Zeroth Dragon of End of the World, Dust, Magallanica's Zeroth Dragon of Distant Sea, Megiddo and Zoo's Zeroth Dragon of Death Garden, Zoa.

Duel Masters Trading Card Game
There are many cards focusing on dragons in Duel Masters such as the ones included in the Epic Dragons of Hyper Chaos set.

See also
List of dragons in film and television
List of dragons in literature
List of dragons in popular culture
List of dragons in mythology and folklore

Notes

References

Dragon characters in video games
Games
Games
Dragons